Harpalus schaumii is a species of ground beetle in the subfamily Harpalinae. It was described by Thomas Vernon Wollaston in 1864.

References

schaumii
Beetles described in 1864